Calliope Beach is the ice-free 2.9 km long beach on the north side of President Head, Snow Island in the South Shetland Islands, Antarctica. It is part of the south coast of Morton Strait, situated east of Karposh Point and north of Oeagrus Beach. The area was visited by early 19th century sealers.

The feature is named after the nymph Calliope, mother of the mythical Thracian musician Orpheus.

Location
Bulgarian mapping in 2009 and 2017.

Maps
 L. Ivanov. Antarctica: Livingston Island and Greenwich, Robert, Snow and Smith Islands. Scale 1:120000 topographic map. Troyan: Manfred Wörner Foundation, 2010.  (First edition 2009. )
 L. Ivanov. Antarctica: Livingston Island and Smith Island. Scale 1:100000 topographic map. Manfred Wörner Foundation, 2017. 
 Antarctic Digital Database (ADD). Scale 1:250000 topographic map of Antarctica. Scientific Committee on Antarctic Research (SCAR). Since 1993, regularly upgraded and updated

Notes

References
 Calliope Beach. SCAR Composite Gazetteer of Antarctica
 Bulgarian Antarctic Gazetteer. Antarctic Place-names Commission. (details in Bulgarian, basic data in English)

External links
 Calliope Beach. Adjusted Copernix satellite image

Beaches of the South Shetland Islands
Bulgaria and the Antarctic